An independence referendum was held in the Republic of Uzbekistan on 29 December 1991, alongside presidential elections. The result was 98.3% of voters in favour, with a turnout of 94.1%.

Background
In a USSR-wide referendum held in March, 95% of voters in the Uzbek SSR voted in favour of preserving the Soviet Union as "a renewed federation of equal sovereign republics in which the rights and freedom of an individual of any nationality will be fully guaranteed?". There was also a separate question asked only in the Uzbek SSR, with 95% of voters voting in favour of the proposal that the country "should remain part of a renewed Union (federation) as a sovereign republic with equal rights".

However, following the attempted coup d'état in August, it was decided to seek independence. Independence was subsequently declared on 31 August, and the Soviet Union ceased to exist on 26 December 1991, three days before the referendum.

Results

References

Dissolution of the Soviet Union
Uzbekistan
1991 in Uzbekistan
1991
Uzbekistan